Eartha Kitt Sings Songs from the Edward L. Alperson CinemaScope Production of Leonard Sillman's "New Faces" (also referred to as Eartha Kitt Sings, or simply Eartha Kitt) is the first extended play record recorded by American singer Eartha Kitt, released in 1954 by RCA Victor. It includes her singles "Monotonous" from 1952 and "Santa Baby" from 1953, both of which were featured in the 1954 film New Faces. The EP was released to promote the film, which included two other songs from the motion picture ("C'est si bon" and "Uska Dara").

Track listing

References 

1954 EPs
Eartha Kitt albums
RCA Victor EPs